Gnathostoma is a genus of parasitic nematodes. The species Gnathostoma spinigerum and Gnathostoma hispidum can cause gnathostomiasis.

Neurognathostomiasis occurs in the USA. Gnathostoma binucleatum (which is native to the Americas) has not been previously reported to cause neurognathostomiasis, suggesting that G. spinigerum has been introduced to the Americas, but a survey of isolates has not confirmed this.

Species 
 Gnathostoma binucleatum (Almeyda-. Artigas, 1991)
 Gnathostoma doloresi
 Gnathostoma hispidum (Fedtschenko, 1872)
 Gnathostoma lamothei
 Gnathostoma malaysiae (Miyazaki & Dunn, 1965)
 Gnathostoma nipponicum
 Gnathostoma spinigerum Levinsen, 1889
 Gnathostoma turgidum

References

External links 
 Taxon: Genus Gnathostoma, Taxonomicon
 Gnathostoma, Pet Education.
 

Spirurida
Secernentea genera
Parasitic nematodes of vertebrates